Florimond-Benjamin MacCurtain was a French Politician and Soldier who gained notoriety during the late 18th and early 19th century. He entered military services in the French Royal Army in 1781 at seventeen years of age. He was quickly granted the rank of ‘Commissioner of War’ within the Army, and elected deputy of the Loire-Inferior to the Council of Five Hundred. During the revolution he was sentenced to deportation because of his father's status as a knight and landowner, but was able to escape from this and join the Chouans. He campaigned for the royalists in Upper Brittany and Lower Anjou for some time. During the French Consulate, he was relieved of his duties and remained out of public affairs during the age and chaos of Napoleon. Following the restoration of the French monarchy he was permitted to rejoin the legitimist Army of Louis XVIII in 1814, and appointed military superintendent on October 4, 1820, an office which he held until his retirement on June 7, 1834. He was granted the Barony of Kainlis for his service to the French Crown, as well as the distinction of an ‘Officer of the Legion of Honor’.

Irish Ancestry
Florimond is the great-grandson of the Irish Officer, Cornelius Curtain, who was in the service of King James II, and was briefly posted in France during the infamous Flight of the Wild Geese.

Ancestry

References

1764 births
1857 deaths
18th-century French people